The 2022 AAMI Community Series was the Australian Football League (AFL) pre-season competition played before the 2022 home and away season. Each team played one match. All matches were televised live on Fox Footy as well as on the Kayo Sports app.

Results

References

AAMI Community Series
A
Australian Football League pre-season competition